Romance of the Jukebox is the thirteenth studio album by Australian pop vocal group Human Nature set for release in August 2018.

The album was supported by a "one night only" concert on 21 August 2018 at The Star in Sydney.

Track listing

Charts

References

2018 albums
Human Nature (band) albums
Covers albums
Sony Music Australia albums